The 2018 Missouri Valley Conference men's basketball tournament, popularly referred to as "Arch Madness", was the postseason men's basketball tournament that completed the 2017–18 season in the Missouri Valley Conference. The Tournament was held at the Scottrade Center, now known as the Enterprise Center, in St. Louis, Missouri from March 1–4, 2018. 

The Tournament marked the first tournament with Valparaiso as a member of the MVC, having replaced Wichita State when the Shockers joined the American Athletic Conference in June 2017.

The tournament's top seed, Loyola–Chicago defeated the No. 3 seed Illinois State in the championship game to receive the Missouri Valley's automatic bid to the NCAA tournament.

Seeds
Teams were seeded by conference record, with ties broken by overall record in conference games played between the tied teams, then (if necessary) by overall adjusted RPI on the day following the conclusion of the regular season as calculated in Collegiate Basketball News' Men's RPI Report. The top six seeds received opening round byes.  

With a win at Southern Illinois on February 21, Loyola–Chicago clinched the outright MVC championship and the No. 1 seed.

Schedule

Tournament bracket

* denotes overtime period

References

2017–18 Missouri Valley Conference men's basketball season
Missouri Valley Conference men's basketball tournament